Below is a sortable list of compositions by Karol Szymanowski.  The works are categorized by genre, Michałowski catalogue number, opus number, date of composition, titles and scoring.

Sources
 
 Michałowski, Kornel. Karol Szymanowski, 1882–1937. Katalog tematyczny dzieł i bibliografia (Karol Szymanowski, 1882–1937. Thematic Catalogue of Works and Bibliography). Kraków: Polskie Wydawnictwo Muzyczne, 1967.

References

 
Szymanowski, Karol